Frank Hansen (born 4 August 1945) is a retired rower from Norway who specialized in the double sculls. In this event, he won silver medals at the 1972 Summer Olympics and 1972 European Championships, together with Svein Thøgersen.

Since 1974, Hansen rowed with his younger brother Alf. They won a silver medal at the 1974 World Championships, followed by gold medals at the 1975, 1978 and 1979 World Championships and at the 1976 Summer Olympics.

References

External links
 
 
 

1945 births
Living people
Norwegian male rowers
Olympic rowers of Norway
Olympic gold medalists for Norway
Olympic silver medalists for Norway
Rowers at the 1972 Summer Olympics
Rowers at the 1976 Summer Olympics
Olympic medalists in rowing
Rowers from Oslo
World Rowing Championships medalists for Norway
Medalists at the 1976 Summer Olympics
Medalists at the 1972 Summer Olympics
European Rowing Championships medalists